VVZ may refer to:
 Veronika Velez-Zuzulová, a World Cup alpine ski racer from Slovakia.
 Takhamalt Airport, an airport serving Illizi, Algeria.